The Kilimanjaro Darkjazz Ensemble was a Dutch band formed in Utrecht, Netherlands, in 2000. The group is composed of Jason Kohnen, Gideon Kiers, trombonist Hilary Jeffery, cellist Nina Hitz, singer Charlotte Cegarra, guitarist Eelco Bosman, and violinist Sadie Anderson. The group is no longer active. Its live counterpart is The Mount Fuji Doomjazz Corporation.

History
Kohnen and Kiers initially formed the group, often abbreviated as TKDE, as a project for scoring silent movies such as Nosferatu and Metropolis. Kohnen and Kiers knew each other from studying at the Utrecht School of Arts. The hitherto electronic project was altered in 2004 when British trombonist Jeffery and Swiss cellist Hitz joined. As a quartet, the group released their debut album. Since then, the group has added Cegarra and Bosman in 2006, and Anderson in 2008. The group formed the Mount Fuji Doomjazz Corporation in 2007 as an improvisational side project. The group released their crowd-funded From the Stairwell in 2011. In 2014, the group unofficially disbanded. Jason Kohnen confirmed this on his new project's Facebook page.

Discography
Studio albums
 The Kilimanjaro Darkjazz Ensemble (2006, Planet Mu)
 Here Be Dragons (2009, Ad Noiseam, Denovali Records)
 From the Stairwell (2011, Denovali Records)
Live albums
 I Forsee The Dark Ahead, If I Stay (2011, Parallel Corners, Denovali Records)
EP
 Mutations (2009, Ad Noiseam, Denovali Records)

In 2016 Denovali Records started re-releasing the complete back catalogue of the band.

References

Musical groups established in 2000
Musical groups disestablished in 2014
Dutch jazz ensembles
Denovali Records artists
Planet Mu artists